Jack Brittingham (born June 14, 1958) is an American director of television programs and videos about hunting. He was host of the show “Jack Brittingham’s World of Hunting Adventure”, which ran on the Outdoor Channel from 2005 through 2007. He operates a hunting ranch in Tanzania.

Television and video
The show “Jack Brittingham’s World of Hunting Adventure” is a series of big game hunts in different countries, such as hunting for Marco Polo sheep in Tajikistan or ducks and geese in Canada hunting.

In 2005 Brittingham's show was nominated for The Outdoor Channel’s Golden Moose Awards for the category of “Best Waterfowl Footage.” The show ran for three seasons (2005-2007).

Brittingham has produced 34 video titles about whitetail, caribou, bear, sheep and waterfowl.

References

General
Official Site
Texas Trophy Hunters Association – Journal of The Texas Trophy Hunters – Waking a Sleeping Giant: Archer completes quest for P&Y record brown bear in Alaska
Dallas Morning News, Wednesday, November 9, 2005 Deer elusive this season? Not for these hunters. Some big bucks taken across the state despite warm November
Austin American-Statesman, Thursday, December 1, 2005 – Panhandle hunt: deer grow large, wind blows cold
Dallas Morning News, Wednesday, October 18, 2006 – Texan's range is ample – Dallas man operates a sprawling hunting concession in Tanzania

American television directors
Living people
1958 births